Vaccinium moupinense, also known as the Himalayan blueberry, is a species of perennial shrub in the genus Vaccinium. The shrub is native to the Chinese Himalayas, particularly to Western Sichuan Province. It flowers in late spring and early summer.

References

arctostaphylos
Flora of Sichuan